In mathematics, an Adams operation, denoted ψk for natural numbers k,  is a cohomology operation in topological K-theory, or any allied operation in algebraic K-theory or other types of algebraic construction, defined on a pattern introduced by Frank Adams. The basic idea is to implement some fundamental identities in symmetric function theory, at the level of vector bundles or other representing object in more abstract theories.

Adams operations can be defined more generally in any λ-ring.

Adams operations in K-theory
Adams operations ψk on K theory (algebraic or topological) are characterized by the following properties.
 ψk are ring homomorphisms.
 ψk(l)= lk if l is the class of a line bundle.
 ψk are functorial.

The fundamental idea is that for a vector bundle V on a topological space X, there is an analogy between Adams operators and exterior powers, in which

ψk(V) is to Λk(V)

as

the power sum Σ αk is to the k-th elementary symmetric function σk

of the roots α of a polynomial P(t). (Cf. Newton's identities.) Here Λk denotes the k-th exterior power. From classical algebra it is known that the power sums are certain integral polynomials Qk in the σk. The idea is to apply the same polynomials to the Λk(V), taking the place of σk. This calculation can be defined in a K-group, in which vector bundles may be formally combined by addition, subtraction and multiplication (tensor product). The polynomials here are called Newton polynomials (not, however, the Newton polynomials of interpolation theory).

Justification of the expected properties comes from the line bundle case, where V is a Whitney sum of line bundles. In this special case the result of any Adams operation is naturally a vector bundle, not a linear combination of ones in K-theory. Treating the line bundle direct factors formally as roots is something rather standard in algebraic topology (cf. the Leray–Hirsch theorem). In general a mechanism for reducing to that case comes from the splitting principle for vector bundles.

Adams operations in group representation theory
The Adams operation has a simple expression in group representation theory.  Let G be a group and ρ a representation of G with character χ.  The representation ψk(ρ) has character

References

  

Algebraic topology
Symmetric functions